Jiwan Kada Ki Phool' (Nepali:जीवन काँडा कि फूल) is a book and Madan Puraskar winner written by Jhamak Ghimire about her own story. It has been printed seven times within two years making it the Nepali best seller of all time. It has also received many other awards. It has recently been translated into English as “A flower in the midst of thorns”. It is all about her life and the difficulties she faced.

Reception 
The book won the prestigious Madan Puraskar for 2010. It also won the Padmashree Sahitya Puraskar in the same year

See also 

 Nyaya 
 Singha Durbarko Ghumne Mech
 Khalangama Hamala

References

Madan Puraskar-winning works
2010 non-fiction books
Works about cerebral palsy and other paralytic syndromes
Nepalese biographies

Nepalese books
Nepalese non-fiction books
Nepalese non-fiction literature
Padmashree Sahitya Puraskar-winning works
Nepalese autobiographies